Mikael Patrik "Totte" Gerrbrand (born 27 April 1981) is a Swedish former professional footballer who played as a defender. Starting off his career with Hammarby IF in 2000, he went on to also represent Leicester City and Fredrikstad before retiring at Nacka FF in 2015. A youth international for Sweden, he appeared seven times for the Sweden U21 team between 2003 and 2004.

Club career
A central defender, Gerrbrand began playing football for Älvsjö AIK before heading to Hammarby as at 14 years of age. He played through the youth ranks before making his professional debut in 2000, and played for five more seasons, winning the Swedish Allsvenskan in 2001. In July 2005 he signed for Leicester City, making 21 appearances in all competitions for the Championship side during the 2005–06 season.

Gerrbrand signed for the Norwegian club in July 2006, transferring from Leicester City because he did not have a future for the first-team. He signed a three and a half year contract with Fredrikstad. He played most of Fredikstad's games until the 2009 season, where he only played in two of their first thirteen games and was released by mutual consent on 15 June 2009.

Just a few days after he left FFK, he signed for his youth and favourite club Hammarby IF. He signed a two and a half year-contract with "Bajen".

International career
Gerrbrand made seven appearances for the Swedish under-21 team, but never appeared in a senior international match. He was a part of Sweden's squad at the 2004 UEFA European Under-21 Championship, in which he played in four games as Sweden finished fourth.

Honours
Hammarby IF
Allsvenskan: 2001
Fredrikstad

 Norwegian Cup: 2006

References

External links
 
 Player profile at Fredrikstad FK

1981 births
Living people
Swedish footballers
Leicester City F.C. players
Fredrikstad FK players
Hammarby Fotboll players
Expatriate footballers in England
Expatriate footballers in Norway
Swedish expatriate sportspeople in Norway
Swedish expatriate footballers
Sweden under-21 international footballers
Allsvenskan players
Eliteserien players
Association football defenders
Boo FK players
Boo FK managers
Swedish football managers